Slănic-Moldova, formerly Băile Slănic, is a town and a spa resort in Bacău County, Romania. The town administers two villages: Cerdac and Cireșoaia.

Gallery

References

External links

 Town website (in Romanian)

Populated places in Bacău County
Localities in Western Moldavia
Towns in Romania
Spa towns in Romania